Amandi (also Romanized as Amandī, Amandy, and Ammandī; also known as Amand) is a village in Mavazekhan-e Sharqi Rural District, Khvajeh District, Heris County, East Azerbaijan Province, Iran. At the 2006 census, its population was 847, in 196 families.

References 

Populated places in Heris County